Titli can refer to:

 Titli (2002 film), a 2002 Bengali film
 Titli (2014 film), a 2014 Hindi film
 "Titli", a song from the 2013 film, Chennai Express
 Titli (serial), a 2017 Pakistani serial drama
 Titli (TV series), an Indian television drama which premiered in 2020

See also
Titlis, a mountain in the Swiss Alps